The Thermales-rpoB RNA motif is a conserved RNA structure that was discovered by bioinformatics.
Thermales-rpoB motifs are found in Thermales.

Thermales-rpoB motif RNAs likely function as cis-regulatory elements, in view of their positions upstream of protein-coding genes, which invariably encode subunits of RNA polymerase.  Such genes are also believed to be regulated by the Rhodo-rpoB RNA motif, although these two motifs occur in quite diverged lineages of bacteria.

References

Cis-regulatory RNA elements regulating RNA polymerase genes
Non-coding RNA